Otothyropsis polyodon is a species of armored catfish found in the tributaries of the Rio Verde which is a tributary to the upper Rio Paraná basin in Mato Grosso do Sul, Brazil.

Etymology
Poly means many; odon means tooth, referring to higher number of teeth compared to other species in this genus.

References

Calegari, B.B., P. Lehmann A. and R.E. Reis, 2013. Two new species of cascudinhos of the genus Otothyropsis (Siluriformes: Hypoptopomatinae) from the rio Paraná basin, Brazil. Zootaxa 3619(2):130-144.

Otothyrinae
Catfish of South America
Fish of Brazil
Endemic fauna of Brazil
Taxa named by Bárbara Borges Calegari
Taxa named by Pablo Cesar Lehmann-Albornoz
Taxa named by Roberto Esser dos Reis
Fish described in 2013